Hammersmith North was a borough constituency in the Metropolitan Borough of Hammersmith in West London. It returned one Member of Parliament (MP) to the House of Commons of the Parliament of the United Kingdom, elected by the first past the post system.

History 
The constituency was created when the Hammersmith constituency was divided for the 1918 general election. It was abolished for the 1983 general election when it was partly replaced by a new Hammersmith constituency.

In its early years the constituency regularly changed hands between Labour and the Conservatives, but it was a Labour seat from a by-election in 1934 until its abolition in 1983.

Boundaries

1918–1950

The seat was created by the Representation of the People Act 1918, and was defined as consisting of wards Four, Five, Six and Seven of the Metropolitan Borough of Hammersmith.

1950–1955
 The original  boundaries were used until the 1950 general election. The wards of the metropolitan borough had been redrawn since 1918, and the seat was redefined by the Representation of the People Act 1948 as comprising six wards: College Park & Latimer, Coningham, Old Oak, Starch Green, White City and Wormholt.

1955–1974
 The House of Commons (Redistribution of Seats) Act 1949 allowed for periodic reviews of constituency boundaries. Seats in the two metropolitan boroughs of Hammersmith and Fulham were redrawn prior to the 1955 general election. The neighbouring seat of Hammersmith South was abolished and the three wards of Addison, Olympia and St. Stephen's were transferred to the North constituency.

1974–1983
The last redrawing of the boundaries of the constituency took place prior to the February 1974 election. In 1965 the former metropolitan borough had become part of the larger London Borough of Hammersmith, and the seat was defined as consisting of ten wards of the London Borough, namely: Addison, Broadway, Brook Green, College Park & Old Oak, Coningham, Grove, St. Stephen's, Starch Green, White City and Wormholt.

Members of Parliament

Election results

Election in the 1910s

Election in the 1920s

Election in the 1930s

Election in the 1940s
General Election 1939–40

Another General Election was required to take place before the end of 1940. The political parties had been making preparations for an election to take place and by the Autumn of 1939, the following candidates had been selected; 
Labour: D.N. Pritt
Conservative: Leonard Caplan

Elections in the 1950s

Elections in the 1960s

Elections in the 1970s

References 

Parliamentary constituencies in London (historic)
Constituencies of the Parliament of the United Kingdom established in 1918
Constituencies of the Parliament of the United Kingdom disestablished in 1983
Politics of the London Borough of Hammersmith and Fulham